Macrocybe praegrandis is a species of mushroom that is native to Brazil.

References

External links

Tricholomataceae
Fungi of Brazil
Taxa named by Miles Joseph Berkeley